Doon International School, Bhubaneswar is the third branch of the  Doon International School in Dehradun and Mohali. It is a co-educational school, located adjacent to the All India Institute of Medical Sciences, Bhubaneswar, in Sijua, Bhubaneswar, Odisha, India.

References

External links

 Official website

International schools in India
Schools in Bhubaneswar
Educational institutions established in 2014
2014 establishments in Odisha